Law Lady may refer to:
 A female Law Lord
 Brenda Hale, Baroness Hale of Richmond, the only such female Law Lord
 "The Law Lady", 1955 episode of The Lone Ranger TV series

See also
 The Law and the Lady (disambiguation)
 Lawman (disambiguation)
 Lady (disambiguation)